Hartvig Nissen (1857 – February 4, 1924) was a Norwegian gymnast mostly active within Norway and the USA. He later worked in politics.

Childhood 
Nissen was born in the neighborhood of Kongshavn, near Oslo, in 1857. He was the 8th child out of 10 in his family. His father, Ole Hartvig Nissen, was the owner and principal of a small private school. In 1867, Hartvig was named chief of Norway's public schools. Nissen graduated from high school in 1872. An eye injury suffered during a childhood snowball fight prevented him from entering military school.

Youth 
As a young man, Nissen joined the Merchant's Club, Singing Club and Christiania (Oslo) Turnforening or Gymnastics Club. He began teaching gymnastics in April of 1875 and was the Instructor of Gymnastics in the Latin School of Drammen. He also taught at the Gymnastic Clubs of the cities of Drammen, Holmestrand and Kongsberg in Norway. Nissen later became a Teacher's Assistant and the Principal of Oslo Turnforening.

Around 1879, he studied the German system of gymnastics in Dresden, Saxony. He was considered to be the strongest gymnast in Norway during the late 1870s and up until he left Norway for the U.S. on January 26, 1883. He arrived in New York City on February 15, 1883.

Working days in Washington, D.C.
In March 1883 he moved to Washington, D.C., where he visited the German Gymnastic Club a few days after arriving. He obtained a position teaching a class of fourteen women.  Within a few weeks he had 50 women students between the ages of 13 to 50 attending his classes. He also held classes at the Franklin School until the spring of 1885.

In September 1883 he opened a high school in an armory on "E" street between 9 and 10 N.W.

On January 4, 1884, he held an exhibition at his high school with girls and boys performing Swedish gymnastics, wand exercises, dumbbells, fancy steps, Swedish folk dances and games. This was the first time Swedish gymnastics and folk dances were officially exhibited in the United States.

In September 1883, he rented a three-storey building at 903 16th street, two blocks from the White House, and named it "The Swedish Health Institute".

He married a Swedish woman, Helene Peterson, in the summer of 1884. She had been his assistant since the opening of the Swedish Health Institute.

Nissen is thought to have introduced the study of Swedish Gymnastics, and Swedish Massage to the United States.

Death 
Nissen died of heart failure on February 4, 1924.

Bibliography 
Nissen has an extensive bibliography. His best known books include:

ABC of the Swedish System of Educational Gymnastics: A Practical Hand-Book for School Teachers and the Home
Gymnastic Systems
Health by Exercises without Apparatus
Practical Massage and Corrective Exercises with Applied Anatomy
Rational Home Gymnastics
School Gymnastic-Card System
A Manual on Swedish Movements and Massage Treatments

References

External links 
Practical Massage and Corrective Exercises with Applied Anatomy by Hartvig Nissen
Famous Massage Therapists - Hartvig Nissen
OTHER INFLUENCES ON AMERICAN GYMNASTICS - Posse and Nissen

1857 births
1924 deaths
Norwegian gymnasts
People associated with physical culture